The Order of Ikkos is a medallion award for coaching made available to all individual U.S. Olympic and Paralympic medalists as representing the athletes' achievement as an Olympic or Paralympic Medalist, in recognition of countless hours training America’s athletes to achieve the dream of an Olympic medal. Each U.S. medal-winning team receives one Order of Ikkos medal to present to a single coach. The medalists can present the award to one coach or mentor. The award is presented as part of each U.S. Olympic medalist's victory tour. The victory tour takes place 24–36 hours after a U.S. athlete wins an Olympic or Paralympic medal. The award was established by the United States Olympic Committee prior to the Beijing 2008 Olympic Games, and continued at the 2010 Olympic Games.

The Order of Ikkos name comes from Ikkos of Tarentum (Taranto), who was first Olympic coach in ancient Greece. It provides the opportunity for athletes to recognize their coaches for their leadership and inspiration to achieve world-class performance.

External links
 Team USA site about the Order of Ikkos

United States at the Olympics
United States at the Paralympics